FC Kärnten was an Austrian association football club based in Klagenfurt, Carinthia. It was founded in 1920 under the name of KSK Klagenfurt.

History

Austria Klagenfurt
Austria Klagenfurt played successfully in the Kärntner Liga and in 1960 were promoted to the Austrian Regional League Central where they won the 1961–62 championship. Then a member of the Austrian Football Bundesliga (Liga A), they  intermittently stayed in first league until their final relegation in 1989. In the 1992–93 season, the club found itself back in the Kärntner Liga.

Though Austria Klagenfurt again gained the promotion to the Regional League Central in 1996, it seemed that the Carinthian Clubs would have to work together in order to send a team to the Bundesliga. This led to cooperation between SK Austria and Villacher SV, who also played in the Regional League, and were based in the nearby town of Villach. In 1997, the clubs changed their name to FC Austria Klagenfurt/VSV and were promoted to the First League.

FC Kärnten
In 1999, the clubs formally merged under the name FC Kärnten''. After the hiring of manager Walter Schachner in 2001, the team won the Austrian Cup, the Supercup and became champions of the First League, resulting in promotion to the Bundesliga the following season. The club, under the honorary presidency of Governor Jörg Haider, once again reached the finals of the Austrian Cup and the Supercup in 2003, which they both lost to FK Austria Wien. FC Kärnten played in the Bundesliga for three years until relegation in 2004.

Their decline continued, exacerbated by the resignation of Jörg Haider in 2006 and the foundation of rival club SK Austria Kärnten in June 2007, who assumed the Bundesliga licence of the defunct ASKÖ Pasching. The team had to cede their stadium, the present-day Hypo-Arena, to Austria Kärnten and retire to the small Fischl ground. At the end of the 2007–08 season, FC Kärnten slipped into the Regional League, prompting several players to leave the club.

In November 2008, the club went into administration, and the club ceased operations on 21 January 2009. The team's tradition is continued by the SK Austria Klagenfurt football club founded in 2007.

Honours

Domestic

League
Austrian Second Division:
Winners (2): 1981–82, 2000–01

Cups
Austrian Cup:
Winners (1): 2000–01
 Runners-up (1): 2002–03
Austrian Supercup:
Winners (1): 2001
 Runners-up (1): 2003

European cup history
Q = Qualification

Managers
 August Starek (1998–99)
 Walter Schachner (2000–02)
 Rüdiger Abramczik (2002–03)
 Dietmar Constantini (2003)
 Peter Pacult (2004–05)
 Nenad Bjelica (2007–09)

References

External links
 fckarnten.at Official club website

 
Association football clubs established in 1920
Association football clubs disestablished in 2009
Defunct football clubs in Austria
Sport in Klagenfurt
1920 establishments in Austria
2009 disestablishments in Austria